STQ is the call sign of a regional television station in Queensland, Australia.

It may also refer to:

STQ, the IATA airport code for St. Marys Municipal Airport in Pennsylvania
STQ, the ISO language code for the Saterland Frisian language
Skill testing question
Société des traversiers du Québec, ferry operator in Quebec, Canada
stq: ISO 639-3 code for Saterland Frisian language